Turati is a surname. Notable people with the surname include:

Augusto Turati (1888–1955), Italian journalist and politician
Emilio Turati (1858-1938), Italian entomologist
Filippo Turati (1857–1932), Italian sociologist, criminologist, poet and politician
Hercules Turati or Ercole Turati (1829–1881), Italian banker and naturalist
Marco Turati (born 1982), Italian footballer
Stefano Turati (born 2001), Italian footballer

See also
  

Surnames of Italian origin